Timber Cove is a census-designated place (CDP) in Sonoma County, California. The 2010 United States census reported Timber Cove's population was 164.

Geography
According to the United States Census Bureau, the CDP covers an area of 5.7 square miles (14.6 km), all of it land.

Demographics
The 2010 United States Census reported that Timber Cove had a population of 164. The racial makeup of the CDP was 92.7% White, 0.6% African American, 0.6% Native American, 3.7% Asian, and 2.4% from two or more races. 5.5% of the population Hispanic or Latino of any race.

The Census reported that 100% of the population lived in households.

There were 85 households, out of which 16 (18.8%) had children under the age of 18 living in them, 40 (47.1%) were opposite-sex married couples living together, 4 (4.7%) had a female householder with no husband present, 5 (5.9%) had a male householder with no wife present.  There were 5 (5.9%) unmarried opposite-sex partnerships, and 1 (1.2%) same-sex married couples or partnerships. 30 households (35.3%) were made up of individuals, and 10 (11.8%) had someone living alone who was 65 years of age or older. The average household size was 1.93. There were 49 families (57.6% of all households); the average family size was 2.43.

The population was spread out, with 22 people (13.4%) under the age of 18, 2 people (1.2%) aged 18 to 24, 23 people (14.0%) aged 25 to 44, 84 people (51.2%) aged 45 to 64, and 33 people (20.1%) who were 65 years of age or older.  The median age was 55.4 years. For every 100 females, there were 127.8 males.  For every 100 females age 18 and over, there were 125.4 males.

The homeowner vacancy rate was 5.4%; the rental vacancy rate was 19.5%. 61.6% of the population lived in owner-occupied housing units and 38.4% lived in rental housing units.

Modern history
Timber Cove was first settled by non-indigenous people in about 1856.  It was one of many "doghole ports" on California's "Redwood Coast," where lumber was sent down from the top of a bluff via a chute to load schooners anchored in a small harbor.  The town was heavily engaged in the lumber industry from that time until about 1925, when ranching and dairy farming became the major local industry.

Notable sight
A 93-foot statue by San Francisco-based Italian-American sculptor Beniamino Bufano, alternatively known as Bufano's Peace Obelisk, Madonna of Peace, or The Expanding Universe, stands on a bluff overlooking the Pacific, within the grounds of the Timber Cove Resort.  The statue later became the focal point of a tiny state park that extends in a 60-foot radius from it.  It was built between 1962 and 1970.

References

Census-designated places in Sonoma County, California
Census-designated places in California
Populated coastal places in California